The Rabbit Ears Range is a mountain range of the Rocky Mountains in north-central Colorado in the United States. The range stretches east–west along the continental divide, forming the border between Grand and Jackson counties, and separating Middle Park (south) from North Park (north).

It connects the Front Range on the east with the Park Range and the Gore Range on the west. It is traversable at Willow Creek Pass. Muddy Pass separates the Rabbit Ears Range to the east from the Park Range to the north. Rabbit Ears Pass and Rabbit Ears Peak, despite their names, are not in the Rabbit Ears Range, but actually part of the Park Range to the south.

Highest peaks 
Parkview Mountain (12,301 ft)
Sheep Mountain (11,819 ft)
Elk Mountain (11,419 ft)

References

External links

Ranges of the Rocky Mountains
Mountain ranges of Colorado
Landforms of Jackson County, Colorado
Landforms of Grand County, Colorado
Arapaho National Forest